Zhao Shuxia (Susie Chen 趙淑俠; * 30 December 1931 in Beijing) is a Chinese author.

Life 
Zhao Shuxia comes from a Manchurian landowning family, was married to Yannian Chen (physicist), lived in Switzerland from 1961 to 2001 and in the US since 2001.

Zhao is the founder and honorary chairwoman of the Association of Chinese language writers in Europe. She has published short stories, novels and essays in Chinese on experiences of overseas Chinese in Europe. Two volumes of stories ("Traumspuren" 1987, "Der Jadering" 1988) and a novel ("Unser Lied" Vol. 1, 1996) are available in German translation. In the 1980s and 1890s she was one of the most famous Chinese-speaking authors in Europe.

Works (selection) 
 Saijinhua (Chinesisch) Taschenbuch • 
 Zhao, Shuxia (S: 赵淑侠, P: Zhào Shūxiá). Sai JinhuaBeijing Shiyue Wenyi Chubanshe  (Beijing), October 1990. . - See Google Books page, See Douban page

Footnotes 

Living people
Women librettists
Taiwanese women novelists
Republic of China novelists
Writers from Taipei
Year of birth missing (living people)